Henry Jutsum (1816 – 3 March 1869), was an English landscape painter.

Life and work
Jutsum was born in London and educated in Devonshire. There he acquired a taste for landscape painting, and on returning to London to further his art studies, he drew from nature, frequently in Kensington Gardens. In 1830 he became an apprentice to artist James Stark (of the Norwich School of painters).

He first exhibited at the Royal Academy in 1836 and also showed work at the British Institution. He devoted himself for some time to watercolour painting, probably because of the influence of the work of J S Cotman (an important Norwich School artist), and in 1843 was elected a member of the New Watercolour Society. He continued, however, to exhibit at the Royal Academy, and preferring painting in oil, eventually resigned his membership of the Watercolour Society.

He was a frequent contributor to the chief exhibitions up to his death, and his works were always greatly admired. "The Noonday Walk" in the Royal Collection was engraved for "The Art Journal"; "The Foot Bridge" is in the Victoria and Albert Museum. Jutsum was also an associate of painter Henry Bright.

Jutsum died at Hamilton terrace, St. John's Wood, London in March 1869, aged 53. Many of his own drawings in his possession and others collected by him were sold by auction at Christie's on 17 April 1882.

Principal works
The Foot Bridge (1865 - V & A).
Tintem Abbey - Evening (1843).
Rabbit Warren (1849).
A Cottage Home in the Highlands of Scotland (1853).
The Deer Park (1856).

References

Attribution

External links
Photo of Henry Jutsum (National Portrait Gallery)
Fetching water (1856 - Rehs Galleries))
Country lane with a cottage (Painting from the Government Art Collection)
The River Kidd, Near Knaresborough (1845 painting - REHS)
Harvest Time (Art Renewal Center Museum)
Shepherd and flock on the Sussex coast (watercolour)
Stepping stones within a river landscape (watercolour)

19th-century English painters
English male painters
English watercolourists
Landscape artists
1816 births
1869 deaths
19th-century English male artists